Michael Peel is a British journalist.  He has written for various publications including Granta, New Republic, New Statesman and London Review of Books. He is currently Europe correspondent of the Financial Times.

Biography

Educated at Trinity College, Oxford, where he studied chemistry, Peel joined the Financial Times in 1996. From 2002-2005, Peel was the West Africa correspondent for the Financial Times, based in Lagos, Nigeria. From March 2005 until 2006, Peel was an Associate Fellow of Chatham House, and a freelance journalist. He was appointed legal correspondent of the Financial Times in 2006, and has been middle east correspondent for the newspaper since January 2011.

Michael Peel's first book, A Swamp Full of Dollars (2009) was shortlisted for the Guardian First Book Award 2009.

Bibliography

Peel, Michael (2006). Nigeria-Related Financial Crime and its Links with Britain. Chatham House Report. 
Peel, Michael (2009). A Swamp Full of Dollars: pipelines and paramilitaries at Nigeria's oil frontier. London: I.B. Tauris.

References

External links
Michael Peel, official website
Guardian review of A Swamp Full of Dollars
Michael Peel interview for Guardian First Book Award
Michael Peel contributions to Granta magazine
The West and Michael Peel's Africa (critical comment by Uche Nworah)

Living people
British male journalists
British writers
Alumni of Trinity College, Oxford
Chatham House people
Year of birth missing (living people)